This article provides a summary of results for the general elections to the Canadian province of Newfoundland and Labrador's unicameral legislative body, the Newfoundland and Labrador House of Assembly. The number of seats has varied over time, from a low of twenty-seven for the first election in 1949, to a high of fifty-two during the 1980s and early 1990s. There are currently 40 seats in the house.

The chart on the right shows the information graphically, with the most recent elections on the right. It shows that politics in Newfoundland and Labrador have been dominated by two parties: the Liberal party (red) and the Conservative party (blue).  The Liberal party have won ten out of the seventeen elections held.

This article only covers elections since the province became part of the Canadian Confederation in 1949. It was then named Newfoundland, and its official name changed to Newfoundland and Labrador in 2001. Prior to becoming part of Canada, Newfoundland was a British dominion, and the Newfoundland House of Assembly (as it was known before 2001) was first formed in 1832. For elections prior to 1949, see General elections in Newfoundland (pre-Confederation).

Summary
The table below shows the total number of seats won by the major political parties at each election. It also shows the percentage of the vote obtained by the major political parties at each election, if greater than 0.1%. The winning party's totals are shown in bold. To date, there has only been one election (in 1989) where the party that formed the government did not have the largest share of the vote. Full details on any election are linked via the number of the election at the start of the row.

Notes
 Includes results for Progressive Conservatives.
 Includes results for Co-operative Commonwealth Federation prior to 1963.
 Includes 8.2% for the United Newfoundland Party.
 Includes 2.4% for the Labrador Party.
 Captured less than 1% of the vote. Its vote total is included in the "other" vote share.
 Includes 1.2% for the Labrador Party.
 Includes 11.9% for the Reform Liberal Party.
 Includes 1.0% for the Newfoundland and Labrador Party

See also
 List of political parties in Newfoundland and Labrador
General elections in Newfoundland (pre-Confederation)

References
 
   (2003)

Newfoundland and Labrador general elections
Elections, General